Lysye Gory is the name of several inhabited localities in Russia.

Urban localities
Lysye Gory, Saratov Oblast, a work settlement in Lysogorsky District of Saratov Oblast

Rural localities
Lysye Gory, Tambov Oblast, a selo in Lysogorsky Selsoviet of Tambovsky District of Tambov Oblast